Plectranthias sagamiensis is a fish of the family Serranidae, subfamily Anthiinae.

Distribution
The fish is found in the Western Pacific.

Size

References

Randall, J.E., 1980. Revision of the fish genus Plectranthias (Serranidae: Anthiinae) with description of 13 new species. Micronesia 16(1):101-187.

sagamiensis
Taxa named by Masao Katayama